Weightlifting contested from December 7 to December 14 at the  1998 Asian Games in Bangkok Land Sports Complex, Bangkok, Thailand.

Medalists

Men

Women

Medal table

Participating nations
A total of 163 athletes from 25 nations competed in weightlifting at the 1998 Asian Games:

References
 Weightlifting Database
 Results

 
1998 Asian Games events
1998
Asian Games
Asian
1998